Ignacio de León  (born 15 November 1977 in Montevideo) is a Uruguayan footballer who plays for Deportivo Maldonado.

International career
De León has made one appearance for the senior Uruguay national football team, a friendly against Peru on 24 July 2003.

References

 

1977 births
Living people
Uruguayan footballers
Uruguay international footballers
Centro Atlético Fénix players
C.A. Cerro players
Rocha F.C. players
Central Español players
Club Atlético River Plate (Montevideo) players
Club Nacional de Football players
Tacuarembó F.C. players
Deportivo Maldonado players
Footballers from Montevideo
Association football goalkeepers